Baragaon may refer to:

Baragaon, Himachal Pradesh, a village in the Shimla district, Himachal Pradesh, India
 Baragaon, Jhansi, a town in the Jhansi district, Uttar Pradesh, India
 Baragaon, Varanasi, a town in the Varanasi district, Uttar Pradesh, India
 Baragaon, Nalanda, a village in the Nalanda district, Bihar, India
 Baragaon, Shahjahanpur, a village in the Shahjahanpur district, UP, India
 Baragaon, Jaunpur, a village in Jaunpur district of Uttar Pradesh, India
 Baragaon, Barabanki, a village in Barabanki district of Uttar Pradesh, India
 Baragaon, Karnataka, a village in Belgaum district of Karnataka, India